The 2010 season was the Puerto Rico Islanders seventh season over all, due to the compromise achieved by the United States Soccer Federation between the feuding NASL and the USL the Islanders played in the unified USSF Division 2 Professional League for this season. This article shows player statistics and all matches (official and friendly) that the club have and will play during the 2010 season. It also includes matched played in 2010 for the CONCACAF Champions League 2009–10 and CONCACAF Champions League 2010–11.

Club

Management

Kit

Squad
as of August 1, 2010

Competitions

Overall

USSF D2 Pro League

Regular season

USL Conference standings

Results summary

Results by matchday

CFU Club Championship

Second round

Final round
The top three finishers qualify for the preliminary round of the 2010–11 CONCACAF Champions League.

All matches hosted in Trinidad & Tobago.

Matches

USSF D-2 Pro League regular season

CFU Club Championship

Squad Statistics 
Competitive matches only. Numbers in brackets indicate appearances as a substitute under the Appearance column and number of assists under the Goal column.
Updated to games played May 9, 2010.

Players

Goalkeepers

References

2010
Puerto Rico Islanders
USSF Division 2 Professional League
Islanders